Cheilotoma musciformis is a species of leaf beetles from the subfamily Cryptocephalinae. It can be found in Europe from the east of France to the south of Ukraine, as well as from the north central part of Poland and the Caucasus. The species are black coloured with orange sides. It is endangered in Poland.

References

Clytrini
Beetles described in 1777
Taxa named by Johann August Ephraim Goeze
Beetles of Europe